Lost Tapes of Opio is the tenth solo album by Yes lead singer Jon Anderson, released in 1996.

About the album
Lost Tapes of Opio was originally a music cassette-only release in 1996 of material recorded in the late 1980s and early 1990s. It was released through Anderson's Opio Foundation with proceeds going to UNICEF.

Track listing
Side one
"Release"
"Eireland"
"Miraval"

Side two
"Longwalker Speaks"
"Homage to Sun Ra"
"Opio Symphony - The Heralding; Spring Dance Eternal; Earth Awakening"

All music performed by Jon Anderson.

Re-release 
The album was re-released as The Lost Tapes of Opio on CD by Voiceprint as part of The Lost Tapes series in 2006 with a different track order:

"Release" (27:24)
"Homage to Sun Ra" (9:36)
"Miraval" (8:21)
"Eireland" (7:40)
"Opio Symphony" (8:55) - 1st Movement: The Heralding; 2nd Movement: Spring Dance Eternal; 3rd Movement: Earth Awakening
"Longwalker Speaks" (17:36)

1996 albums
Jon Anderson albums